The 2009–10 ASEAN Basketball League (ABL) Grand Finals Playoffs was the first season of competition since its establishment. A total of four teams competed in the league. It started after the 2009–10 ABL Regular Season ended on 24 January 2010.

The Philippine Patriots of the Philippines won the first ABL championship after defeating Satria Muda BritAma of Indonesia, 3-0, in their best-of-five championship series which ended on 21 February 2010.

Bracket

Semifinals

Patriots vs. Dragons

Slingers vs. Satria Muda

Finals

Awards

Statistics

Season leaders
Last update: End of Round 11

Season highs
Last update: End of Round 11

Teams

See 2009-10 Asean Basketball League squads.

References

External links
 The official website of the Asean Basketball League

Playoffs
ASEAN Basketball League playoffs